Jan Kůrka (born 29 May 1943) is a sport shooter and Olympic champion for Czechoslovakia. He won a gold medal in the 50 metre rifle prone event at the 1968 Summer Olympics in Mexico City.

References

External links

1943 births
Living people
People from Pelhřimov
Czechoslovak male sport shooters
Czech male sport shooters
ISSF rifle shooters
Olympic shooters of Czechoslovakia
Olympic gold medalists for Czechoslovakia
Shooters at the 1968 Summer Olympics
Olympic medalists in shooting
Medalists at the 1968 Summer Olympics
Recipients of Medal of Merit (Czech Republic)
Sportspeople from the Vysočina Region